Manihi Airport  is an airport serving Manihi, an atoll in the Tuamotu archipelago in French Polynesia. It is located 3 km northwest of the village of Paeva.

Airlines and destinations

Statistics

References

External links 

Airports in French Polynesia